Anil Kumar Eravathri is an Indian Politician who represented Balkonda Assembly constituency from 2009 to 2014, as MLA and served as a Government Whip in the united Andhra Pradesh assembly, from 2012 to 2014. He is a US returned engineer who has his own IoT( Internet of things) firm in Hyderabad. He is a member of the Indian National Congress party. Anil is part of the Congress party's Strategy and Campaign Committee for the Munugode bypoll.

Background
Anil Eravathri was born in Nizamabad in Padmashali community. He completed his bachelor's degree in engineering from CBIT, Hyderabad and went to the US for higher studies and started an IT Consulting company before returning to India in 2008.

Career

Anil Kumar Eravathri joined the newly formed Praja Rajyam Party of Telugu hero and film Icon Chiranjeevi in 2009, and contested from Balkonda Assembly constituency in Nizamabad district of Telangana, and won with a majority of 8159 votes in a triangular contest involving the Indian National Congress party and the Telangana Rashtra Samithi. The Indian National Congress party formed the government and PRP had to play the role of opposition in the AP Assembly.

Anil Eravathri became a member of the Indian National Congress party after actor Chiranjeevi decided to merge his party Praja Rajyam Party with the Indian National Congress party in 2011. Anil Eravathri played a key role in the PRP and served as its General Secretary of the state unit before its merger with the Congress party in 2012. He worked closely with the Congress party leaders for the benefit of the farming community and turmeric farmers of his constituency.

Positions held

References

Telugu politicians
Telangana politicians
Living people
Year of birth missing (living people)